Colonel Harold Gore Brown (18 September 1856 - 4 January 1938) commanded the First Battalion of the King's Royal Rifle Corps in the Boer War of 1899–1900, and took part in the Relief of Ladysmith.

He was a member of the King's Bodyguard from 1905 until 1928 as one of H.M. Honourable Corp of Gentlemen-at-Arms. Gore Brown was the Honorary Secretary of the Fair Trade League.

Family 

Harold was the son of Thomas Gore Browne, brother to Ethel Locke King and Wilfrid Gore Browne. He was married to Lady Muriel Murray, daughter of Charles Murray, 7th Earl of Dunmore. His brother Francis's son, Stewart Gore Browne of Shiwa Ngandu was Harold's nephew.

He died at his sister's home on 4 January 1938 at the age of 81 with his funeral held at Weybridge.

Notes

References

External links 
Family portrait showing Harold and his parents and sister

King's Royal Rifle Corps officers
1856 births
1938 deaths
British Army personnel of the Second Boer War